The 1994 United States Senate special election in Tennessee was held November 8, 1994. Incumbent Democratic Senator Al Gore resigned from the Senate following his election as Vice President of the United States in 1992, and this led to the 1993 appointment of Harlan Mathews and the subsequent special election. Mathews did not seek election to a full term, and Representative Jim Cooper subsequently became the Democratic nominee. However, the Republican nominee Fred Thompson won the seat in a decisive victory.

The election was held concurrently with the regular Class 1 Tennessee Senate election, in which Republican Bill Frist defeated incumbent Democrat Jim Sasser. As a result of Thompson and Frist's simultaneous victories in Tennessee, the two elections marked the first time since 1978 that both Senate seats in a state have flipped from one party to the other in a single election cycle. The next time this was repeated was in Georgia in 2020 and 2021 where both the regular election and the special election went from incumbent Republicans to Democrats.

Major candidates

Democratic 
 Jim Cooper, U.S. Representative

Republican 
 Fred Thompson, attorney and actor

Election results

See also 
 1994 United States Senate election in Tennessee
 1994 United States Senate elections

References 

United States Senate
Tennessee (special)
1994
Tennessee 1994
Tennessee 1994
United States Senate 1994